Luigi Dusio (born 1920 in Casorzo) was an Italian clergyman and prelate for the Roman Catholic Diocese of Ihosy. He was appointed bishop in 1967. He died in 1970.

See also
Catholic Church in Madagascar

References 

1920 births
1970 deaths
Italian Roman Catholic bishops